For the military use of the facility before 1969 see Clinton-Sherman Air Force Base
The Clinton-Sherman Industrial Airpark, also known as the Oklahoma Air & Space Port is a spaceport in Washita County, Oklahoma, near the town of Burns Flat. The Federal Aviation Administration (FAA) granted a license to the site in June 2006 to the Oklahoma Space Industry Development Authority (OSIDA) to "oversee the takeoff and landing of suborbital, reusable launch vehicles." It also boasts the first space flight corridor, "The Infinity One"—which is about 152 miles long and averages about 50 miles wide—that is not in restricted airspace and does not interfere with Military Operations Areas (MOAs). The facility is an FAA licensed launch site, one of only 12 in the U.S.  Individual operators must also secure a separate license in order to make space flights from the facility.

Facilities
The airpark is at the site of a public airfield known as Clinton-Sherman Airport . (1,583 x 23 m). The larger of these, at 13,503 x 300 ft (4,116 x 91.4 m) is a major benefit for use as a spaceport.

For the 12-month period ending June 30, 2020, the airport is on track for 30,000 aircraft operations, an average of 82 per day: 90% military and 10% general aviation.

The location is a 2,700 acre (10.8 km²) facility located near transportation corridors such as Interstate 35 and Interstate 40. There are 96 acres (384,000 m²) of parking space able to support large commercial aircraft. There are six commercial aircraft hangars and a 50,000 square-foot (4,500 m²) manufacturing facility with loading docks adjacent to a railway spur.

History
The facility operated for a number years as part of the United States Navy and United States Air Force. Closed under the name Clinton-Sherman Air Force Base, the facility has been redeveloped over the years to its present form.

The location of the former naval air station World War II runways to the north and west of the main runway are still visible on aerial photographs of the airport; however they are not usable.

Operations
One company, Rocketplane Kistler, formerly based in Oklahoma, had plans to build and operate a suborbital spacecraft, the Rocketplane XP, but filed for bankruptcy in 2010 without having successfully launched a flight.

Armadillo Aerospace conducted flight test activities at the Oklahoma Spaceport in 2004 through 2009, including tests of a VTVL Lander and a Rocket Racer for the now-defunct Rocket Racing League.

Large aerospace companies are attracted to the site not only because of the length and size of the runway, but also the fact that there are no obstructions around either end. Boeing in 2013 used the facility for testing an autonomous landing system for the 737, and in 2015 for proficiency training and flight testing with the 747-800. As of February 2020, Boeing intends to utilize the facility for flight tests on their 777X model, as well as for the recertification test flights of their 737 MAX. Cessna and Honda Aircraft have also been customers.

Branches of the Department of Defense—primarily the U.S. Air Force and the Navy—use the airport for the flight training of their aircrews.

Premium Aerospace said in October 2022 that it would be investing $120 million over the next several years to move to the airpark. The project will include renovating and expanding two existing hangers, and constructing a third.  The company does MRO work (maintenance, repair and operations/overhaul) on 737 and larger aircraft.

The former northeast 'alert pads' and ready facility of the former Strategic Air Command base currently houses the Law Enforcement Driver Training Center of the Oklahoma Highway Patrol, Oklahoma Department of Public Safety. Currently referred to as 'Building 120', the former bunker facility houses OHP Academy staff and cadets during the driving training portion of 'Patrol Schools'. The annual 'Cadet Lawman Academy' (sponsored by the OSTA, Elks Lodge, and C.U.D.D.), is also located at the same facility during the summer, which provides a 1-week program for high school students. The surrounding facility and tarmac incorporates over 12 miles of various roadways and courses, used for precision driving and emergency vehicle operation training. This facility is recognized as one of the top ranked law enforcement driver training centers in the country, according to the Federal Law Enforcement Training Center.

References

External links

 Oklahoma Space Industry Development Authority

Economy of Oklahoma
Spaceports in the United States
Buildings and structures in Washita County, Oklahoma
2006 establishments in Oklahoma